Maciej Zarzycki (born 26 July 1998) is a Polish handball player for Gwardia Opole and the Polish national team.

References

1998 births
Living people
Sportspeople from Lublin
Polish male handball players